The Banff-Windermere Highway, also known as the Banff-Windermere Parkway, is a  highway which runs through the Canadian Rockies in British Columbia and Alberta in Canada. It runs from Radium Hot Springs, British Columbia to Castle Junction, Alberta (midway between Banff and Lake Louise), passing through Kootenay National Park and Banff National Park. It is designated as part of British Columbia Highway 93 and Alberta Highway 93.

Route description

The highway passes through the village, passing numerous tourist services, overlooking Sinclair Creek. It continues through Sinclair Canyon and the Radium Hot Springs pools before passing through a short tunnel. East of the summit, the highway reaches a viewpoint of the Kootenay River valley, where it turns north and descends into the valley. The highway follows the Kootenay River to and area known as Kootenay Crossing, where the highway crosses the river and follows the Vermilion River. At the summit, the highway leaves both British Columbia and Kootenay National Park, entering Alberta and Banff National Park. From there, Highway 93 follows Highway 1 to Lake Louise, while the roadway (still referred to as part of the Banff-Windermere Highway) continues another  to the Bow Valley Parkway (Alberta Highway 1A) on the north side of the Bow River.

History

The corridor along the Kootenay and Vermilion Rivers had been used as a first nations travel route for thousands of years. In 1858, Sir James Hector travelled through Vermilion Pass and recommended that it would be the best route for a wagon road. In the early 1900s settlers in the Columbia Valley advocated for improved connections with Banff and Calgary and lobbied the BC provincial government to construct a road. With the overall goal of constructing an all-Canadian road between the Canadian Prairies and Pacific Ocean, the Alberta provincial and federal governments were consulted. Construction began in 1911, and by 1914 the road was opened between Calgary and Vermilion Pass as well as a  western section. The outbreak of World War I resulted in a suspension of construction, and following the conclusion of the war the British Columbia provincial government did not have enough funds to complete the project. This resulted in the creation of Kootenay National Park. The road opened in 1922 and was first highway to cross the Central Canadian Rockies, with the Kicking Horse Trail across Kicking Horse Pass (the corridor which eventually became part of the Trans-Canada Highway) opening in 1926, connecting Lake Louise and Golden.

Former designations

The Banff-Windermere Highway took on the designation of Route 'U in the 1930s until 1941 when British Columbia adopted a numbered highway system, and was designated as Highway 1B'''. In 1953, the highway between Roosville and Elko opened and was designated as Highway 93'' as it was a northern extension of U.S. Route 93, and in 1959 the Banff-Windermere Highway and Icefields Parkway were renumbered to be a part of Highway 93.

Major intersections

See also

References

External links

Alberta provincial highways, 1–216 series
British Columbia provincial highways
Banff National Park
Kootenay National Park